Lepidothamnus intermedius, the yellow silver pine, is a species of conifer in the family Podocarpaceae. It is endemic to New Zealand.

Distribution 
This species is found in the North Island and in western parts of the South Island and Stewart Island.

References

Podocarpaceae
Endemic flora of New Zealand
Least concern plants
Taxonomy articles created by Polbot